Walter Francois  is a Saint Lucian politician who represented the Soufriere/Fond St. Jacques constituency for the Saint Lucia Labour Party and served as Minister for Planning, Development, Environment & Housing until 2002.

References

Living people
Members of the House of Assembly of Saint Lucia
Saint Lucia Labour Party politicians
Year of birth missing (living people)